Navya Natarajan is an Indian actress. She mainly acted in Malayalam, Kannada, and Telugu films.

Filmography

References

External links 
 
 

21st-century Indian actresses
Living people
Actresses in Malayalam cinema
Actresses in Kannada cinema
Actresses in Telugu cinema
Indian film actresses
1987 births